Peter Murphy (born 10 August 1967) is an Australian rower. He competed in the men's eight event at the 1992 Summer Olympics.

References

External links
 

1967 births
Living people
Australian male rowers
Olympic rowers of Australia
Rowers at the 1992 Summer Olympics
Place of birth missing (living people)
20th-century Australian people